Charles Neal Ascherson (born 5 October 1932) is a Scottish journalist and writer. He has been described by Radio Prague as "one of Britain's leading experts on central and eastern Europe". Ascherson is the author of several books on the history of Poland and Ukraine. His work has appeared in The Guardian and The New York Review of Books.

Background 
Ascherson was born in Edinburgh on 5 October 1932, son of a Naval officer of Jewish ancestry and a mother from a London family of Scottish descent; his elder half-sister (by his father's first marriage) was the artist Pamela Ascherson. He was awarded a scholarship to Eton. Before going to university, he did his National Service as an officer in the Royal Marines, serving from July 1951 to September 1952, and seeing combat in Malaya. He then attended King's College, Cambridge, where he read history. The marxist historian Eric Hobsbawm was his tutor at Cambridge and described Ascherson as "perhaps the most brilliant student I ever had. I didn't really teach him much, I just let him get on with it."

Career
After graduating he declined offers to pursue an academic career. Instead, he chose a career in journalism, first at The Manchester Guardian and then at The Scotsman (1959–1960), The Observer (1960–1990) and The Independent on Sunday (1990–1998). He contributed scripts for the documentary series The World at War (1973–74) and the Cold War (1998). He has also been a regular contributor to the London Review of Books.

Ascherson has lectured and written extensively about Polish and Eastern Europe affairs.

In the 1999 election for the Scottish Parliament he stood as the Liberal Democrat candidate in the West Renfrewshire constituency but was not successful. Ascherson supported the "Yes" (pro-independence) campaign in the 2014 Scottish independence referendum.

 Ascherson is a Visiting Professor at the Institute of Archaeology, University College London.  He has been editor of Public Archaeology, an academic journal associated with UCL devoted to CRM and public archaeology issues and developments, since its inception in 1999.

Awards and honours
In 1991 Ascherson was awarded an honorary degree from the Open University as Doctor of the University.

Personal life
Neal Ascherson's first wife was journalist Corinna Adam; the couple first met at Cambridge University and married in 1958. They had two daughters together before separating in 1974. The couple divorced in 1982. Corinna Ascherson, also a journalist, died in March 2012.

In 1984, he married his second wife, journalist Isabel Hilton. The couple currently live in London and have two children.

His aunt was the actress Renée Asherson.

Bibliography

The Spanish Civil War (Granada Television serial script, 1983)
 with Magnus Linklater and Isabel Hilton

Opposition to Turkey's Ilisu Dam rises again with Maggie Ronayne, published 27 November 2007, chinadialogue

"A Mess of Tiny Principalities" (review of Simon Winder, Lotharingia: A Personal History of Europe's Lost Country, Farrar, Straus, and Giroux, 2019, 504 pp.), The New York Review of Books, vol. LXVI, no. 20 (19 December 2019), pp. 66–68.

References

External links

 Neal Ascherson – Guardian
 Neal Ascherson – New York Review of Books
 
 Neal Ascherson's CV at PFD
 
 Neal Ascherson – Prospect
 Interviewed by Alan Macfarlane 14 December 2016 (video)

1932 births
Alumni of King's College, Cambridge
Living people
Scottish people of German-Jewish descent
People associated with the UCL Institute of Archaeology
People educated at Eton College
Writers from Edinburgh
Scottish essayists
Journalists from Edinburgh
Historians of the Democratic Republic of the Congo
Historians of the Soviet Union
Historians of Poland